"Tapping Out" is a song by American metalcore band Issues, released for digital download and streaming as the lead single from their third studio album, Beautiful Oblivion, on May 3, 2019, on Rise Records. It is the group's first song to be released since the departure of vocalist Michael Bohn, as well as the second to feature vocals from AJ Rebello, the first being their previous single "Blue Wall".

Credits and personnel

Issues
 Tyler Carter – lead vocals
 AJ Rebello – guitars, unclean vocals
 Skyler Acord – bass
 Joshua Manuel – drums, percussion

Additional personnel
 Production – Howard Benson
 Engineering – Kris Crummett, Michael Closson, Hatsukazu Inagaki, Mike Plotnikoff, Trevor Dietrich
 Mixing – Kris Crummett, Ricky Orozco
 Songwriting – Skyler Acord, Tyler Carter, Joshua Manuel, AJ Rebello, Erik Ron
 Vocals – Tyler Carter, AJ Rebello
 Guitar – Marc Vangool
 Drums – Jon Nicholson
 Digital editing – Paul DeCarli, Joe Rickard
 Programming – Jonathan Litten

References

2019 singles
2019 songs
Rise Records singles
Song recordings produced by Howard Benson
Songs written by Erik Ron
Songs written by Tyler Carter
Issues (band) songs